Till Steffen (born 22 July 1973) is a German lawyer and politician of Alliance 90/The Greens who has been serving as a member of the German Bundestag since the 2021 elections, representing the Hamburg-Eimsbüttel district.

From 2015 until 2020, Steffen served as Senator of Justice of the city state of Hamburg in the Senate Scholz II and again in the Senate Tschentscher. Already from 2008 to 2010 he held this office in the Senate von Beust III and Senate Ahlhaus.

Early life and career 
Till Steffen was born in Wiesbaden. He studied law at the universities of Mainz, Hamburg, and Aberdeen. He obtained his doctorate in the field of European nature conservation law. In 1997 he came to Hamburg and worked as a lawyer with a focus on administrative law first in the law firm von Harten and since 2008 as a partner in the law firm elblaw Rechtsanwälte.

Political career

Career in state politics 
Steffen has been a member of the Greens since 1990. Prior to his time in Hamburg, he worked from 1993 to 1997 as a city councilor in Wiesbaden. In 1994, he co-founded the Green Youth and was a member of the first federal executive. From 1999 to 2000 he was a member of the regional executive committee of the GAL Hamburg, the Hamburg section of Alliance 90/The Greens. Between 2001 and 2004 he was a group chairman of the GAL in the Eimsbüttel district meeting.

From 17 March 2004 Steffen was a member of the Hamburgische Bürgerschaft. In the 18th electoral term he was a member of the Committee on Internal Affairs, the Legal Committee, the Constitutional Committee and the Special Committee on Administrative Reform. In addition, he was in the supervisory committee "constitutional protection" and the parliamentary committee of inquiry "information dissemination".

As one of the state's representatives at the Bundesrat, Steffen was a member of the Committee on Legal Affairs from 2015 until 2020.

Member of the German Parliament, 2021–present 
In 2020, Steffen announced his intention to run for a seat in the German Parliament in the 2021 German federal election.

In parliament, Steffen has since been serving on the Committee on Legal Affairs and the Committee on the Scrutiny of Elections, Immunity and the Rules of Procedure. Since 2022, he has also been serving on the parliamentary body in charge of appointing judges to the Highest Courts of Justice, namely the Federal Court of Justice (BGH), the Federal Administrative Court (BVerwG), the Federal Fiscal Court (BFH), the Federal Labour Court (BAG), and the Federal Social Court (BSG). That same year, he joined the Commission for the Reform of the Electoral Law and the Modernization of Parliamentary Work, co-chaired by Johannes Fechner and Nina Warken.

In addition to his committee assignments, Steffen has been a member of the German delegation to the Franco-German Parliamentary Assembly since 2022.

Other activities 
 Stiftung Forum Recht, Member of the Board of Trustees (since 2022)

Political positions 
Amid the COVID-19 pandemic in Germany, Steffen joined forces with six other parliamentarians – Dirk Wiese, Heike Baehrens, Dagmar Schmidt, Janosch Dahmen, Katrin Helling-Plahr and Marie-Agnes Strack-Zimmermann – on a cross-party initiative in 2022 to support legislation that would require all adults to be vaccinated.

References 

1973 births
Living people
Alliance 90/The Greens politicians
Senators of Hamburg
Members of the Hamburg Parliament
Politicians from Wiesbaden
People from Eimsbüttel
Members of the Bundestag 2021–2025